The Jász-Nagykun-Szolnok County constituency no. 1 was one of the single member constituencies of the National Assembly, the national legislature of Hungary. The district was established in 1990, when the National Assembly was re-established with the end of the communist dictatorship. It was abolished in 2011.

Members
The constituency was first represented by Zoltán Kis of the Alliance of Free Democrats (SZDSZ) from 1990 to 2002. József Gedei of the Hungarian Socialist Party (MSZP) was elected in 2002 and served until 2010. In the 2010 election, Tamás Szabó of Fidesz was elected representative.

Election result

2010 election

2006 election

2002 election

1998 election

1994 election

1990 election

References

Jasz-Nagykun-Szolnok 1st